Andrés Torres (born 1987) is a Colombian record producer and musician, best known for producing the 2017 song "Despacito" by Puerto Rican singer Luis Fonsi featuring Puerto Rican rapper Daddy Yankee.

Torres made his professional debut in 2012 as an assistant engineer after playing drums in four bands during his teenage years. Shortly after that, he won a scholarship for drummers at the Musicians Institute in Los Angeles and produced his first album thanks to Colombian producer Andrés Saavedra. Through Saavedra, Torres met Argentine producer and engineer Sebastian Krys –recipient of five Grammy Awards– who became his mentor and helped him to work with Spanish singer David Bisbal and Argentine singer Noel Schajris.

Discography

Albums
Main personnel

Other

Singles

Awards and nominations
Latin Grammy Awards

References

1987 births
Living people
Latin music record producers